The Bakarwal (also Bakkarwal, Bakharwal, Bakrawala and Bakerwal) are a nomadic ethnic group, who along with Gujjars are listed as Scheduled Tribes in the Indian Union Territory of Jammu and Kashmir and Ladakh since 1991. Gujjar Bakerwal is the largest Muslim tribe in India and third largest ethnic community in the Indian part of Jammu and Kashmir.

As a nomadic tribe they spread over a large part starting from Pir Panjal to Zanskar located in the Himalayan mountains of India to the Hindukush mountains of Afghanistan. They are goatherders and shepherds at large and seasonally migrate from one place to another with their herds. They are found in the Indian union territory of Jammu and Kashmir and Ladakh and in the Afghan province of Nuristan.

History
In a number of British records, which include a caste survey and census conducted during 1861–1941, the Bakarwals are mentioned as Gujjar shepherds but in an Occupational Survey, they were listed separately as a cattle-rearing community. The Gujjars-Bakarwals claim the same origin as Gujjar. The Gujjars are known by many names: Ajjadh, Dohdhi Gujjars, Banhara Gujjars, and Van-Gujjars. Among Gujjars, those  who rear goats and sheep are called Bakarwals. Gujjars and Bakarwals share the same history, culture, language, sub-caste  and racial identity. Anthropological and genetic studies conducted on Gujjars-Bakarwals conclude that they are not separate identities in any way. In 1991 the Gujjar-Bakarwals were granted tribal status in Jammu and Kashmir by the Indian government after an exhaustive study. The study revealed that Bakarwal is another name for Gujjar and, as such, they were entered into revenue records as a separate tribal category according to the Indian constitution. Bakarwals belong to the same ethnic stock as the Gujjars, and inter-tribal marriages take place freely among them. There are a number of examples where one brother's name was entered in revenue records as Bakarwal while another was categorised as Gujjar.

Etymology 

The term 'Bakarwal' is an occupational one and is derived from the  Gojri word bakara meaning goat or sheep, and wal meaning "one who takes care of". Essentially, the name "Bakarwal" implies "high-altitude goatherd/shepherd".

Society 
The Bakarwals belong to the same ethnic group as the Gujjars, and inter-tribal marriages take place among them. Bakarwals have clans (gotra) like Gujjars; however, "bakarwal" is also occasionally used indiscriminately to refer to any nomadic shephard group in the foothills, even those who may not belong to a Bakarwal community (qafila group).
The Gadaria-Bakarwals have divided themselves into three principal kinship groups:
(i) The dera (household),
(ii) Dada-Potre (lineage),
(iii) the gotra (clan).

The Gujars are also very possessive of the land which they own to graze their livestock and this has led to some land conflicts between the Gujars and their neighbouring groups such as the Nuristanis. The Nuristanis believe that the Gujars are encroaching on their land.  The Gujars believe that they need more land for their livestock since they are nomads so conflicts between the two groups have risen from time to time. The conflicts between the Gujars and the Nuristanis date back to the 19th century. In 1997, the Gujar villagers of Kunar Province also had a disagreement with the Taliban about their land and weapons (It is a tradition for Gujar villagers to keep weapons with them) being confiscated resulting in fighting between the tribal Gujars and the Taliban militants in which the Taliban were driven out of the capital of the Kunar province, Asadabad, by the tribal Gujar militants. Eventually however, an agreement was signed between the Taliban government and the Gujars in which the Gujars were allowed to keep their land and weapons but had to remain loyal to the Islamic Emirate of Afghanistan.

Economy 
As sheep and goat rearing transhumants, the Bakarwals alternate with the seasons between high and low altitudes in the hills of the Himalayas. This is why the Bakarwals as a singular tribe are stretched from the hills of the Hindu Kush in Nuristan to the hills of the Himalayas in Uttarakhand. They are mainly found in the following areas of Nuristan Province, Kunar Province, Khyber Pakhtunkhwa, Azad Kashmir, Jammu and Kashmir, Himachal Pradesh and Uttarakhand. From here, it is clear to see that the Bakarwals mainly follow a migration route through the foothills of the Himalayas as they can be found on the Upper Himalayan Range all the way down into the Lower Himalayan Range.

Legal status 
In 1991 in Jammu and Kashmir, the Bakarwals were first recognized as an Indian Scheduled Tribe. , the Bakarwal were classified as a Scheduled Tribe under the Indian government's general reservation program of positive discrimination.

They (Gujjars) are mentioned in the Afghan National Anthem as one of the integral tribes present in Afghanistan. Lines from the Anthem reads:

هم عرب و گوجر است
پامیری‌ها، نورستانی ها
براهوی است و قزلباش است
هم آیماق و پشه‌ای ها
Translation in English
"..With them, there are Arabs and Gurjars,
Pamiris, Nuristanis,
Brahuis, and Qizilbash;
also Aimaqs and Pashais.
This land will shine forever,
Like the sun in the blue sky".

Genetics 

A study conducted by the CDFD (Centre for DNA Fingerprinting and Diagnostics) concluded that members of the Gujjar community in Jammu and Kashmir, India had patrilineal genetic similarity to the Pashtuns, an eastern Iranic ethnic group native to the Pashtunistan region in modern day Afghanistan and Pakistan. The CDFD analyzed the genetic makeup of 69 samples to find that Gujjars from Jammu and Kashmir did not cluster closely with those from Assam, Bengal, Jharkhand, Karnataka, Maharashtra or Rajasthan.

Male-specific markers called Y-STR which were compared with 37 different population groups in Central, South, and West Asia, as well as in Russia and Europe, found that the Gujjars of Jammu and Kashmir, India shared markers with Pashtuns of the Baghlan and Kunduz provinces of Afghanistan.

The R1a Y-DNA haplogroup was found in high frequencies of the male samples gathered in the Gujjar population of Jammu and Kashmir, India followed by the L and H haplogroups.

Autosomal SNP analyses which analysed the SNPs of populations from Jammu & Kashmir, Uttarakhand including African, European, East Asian and the Kalash from the Human Genome Diversity Project. Using STRUCTURE analysis found that at K2, Africans, Europeans and East Asians, clustered differently from Gujjars, Ladakhis, Jammu and Kashmir, Uttarakhand and Pakistan populations. At K3, Africans separated from Europeans and East Asians; whereas Ladakhis, Jammu and Kashmir and Uttarakhand remained clustered; and Pakistan along with Gujjars formed a separate cluster. Further, Africans, Europeans and East Asians constituted separate clusters at K4 and there was no change in rest of the populations. 

Gujjars and Pakistan populations unglued themselves at K5 and were identified as two distinct clusters. Gujjars were found to be an isolated population at K5 in contrast to other populations from India which showed genetic relatedness.  Figure S3

References

Indigenous peoples of South Asia
Social groups of India
Social groups of Jammu and Kashmir
Ethnic groups in India
Scheduled Tribes of Jammu and Kashmir
Transhumant ethnic groups